Johann Friedrich Anthing (1753–1805) was a German serviceman, artist and historian.

Biography 
Johann Friedrich Anthing was born on 26 May 1753 in Gotha (then in the Saxe-Coburg Duchy, now in Thuringia). After his theological studies in Iena, Anthing travelled across Europe, going from one royal court to the next, as a silhouette artist. He drew portraits of princes, courtiers and famous personalities such as Goethe during his stay at the Weimar court (1789). He was employed in Saint-Petersburg from 1783 and drew portraits of members of the imperial family, including Grand Duke Paul Petrovitch (then Paul I of Russia) and his wife Maria Fedorovna, as well as members of the Saint Petersburg Academy of Sciences. Anthing travelled to Frankfurt in 1790 to attend the crowning of Leopold II, and he published a description of the ceremony. In 1793, Anthing returned to Russia and became Marshal Alexander Suvorov's Aide-de-camp. He would later write a three-volume biography of Suvorov (History of the Campaigns of Marshal Suvorov). After the crowning of Paul I and Suvorov's subsequent disgrace in 1797, Anthing resigned. He spent the last years of his life in Saint-Petersburg and died on 12 August 1805.

Personal life 
Married to a Frenchwoman, he had a daughter, Johanna Maria Sophia "Sophinka" d'Anthing (1799–1823), who would settle in France. He was also the elder brother of general Karl Heinrich Wilhelm Anthing.

Some of his drawings

Selected works 
 Recueil de cent silhouettes de personnes illustres et célèbres dessinées d'après les originaux (1791). In French, on the Deutsche Forschungsgemeinschaft's website : 
 Über Russland, seine Landesart, Sitten, Luxus, Moden und Ergötzlichkeiten (1791)
 Versuch einer Kriegs-Geschichte des Grafen Alex. Suworow (1795–1799) (English : History of the Campaigns of Prince Alexander Suworow Rymnikski, Field-Marshal-General in the Service of His Imperial Majesty, the Emperor of Russia) :

Sources 
 Short biography in German of Johann Friedrich Anthing on the National German Library's website (Deutschen Nationalbibliothek) :  
 Anthing, Johann Friedrich (2002). History of the Campaigns of Prince Alexander Suworow Rymnikski, Field-Marshal-General in the Service of His Imperial Majesty, the Emperor of Russia. BookSurge Publishing.
 Schüddekopf, Johann Friedrich (1913). Johann Friedrich Anthing. Eine Skizze. Weimar: Gesellschaft der Bibliophilen. (Johann Friedrich Anthing. A drawing)

German artists
Military history of Russia
1753 births
1805 deaths